Robert Stell Lemmon (born 26 June 1885 in Englewood, New Jersey; died 3 March 1964 in Wilton, Connecticut), often Robert S. Lemmon in publications, was an American writer and naturalist. He wrote and lectured on domestic dogs, gardening, wildlife, wild flowers and trees.  Most of his writing was non-fiction, but in 1923 he also wrote an adventure short-story called The Bamboo Trap, about an American entomologist caught in a cave in the Ecuadorian jungle.

Career 
Lemmon was the son of William and Caroline Lemmon, née McCulloh. After finishing the Englewood School for Boys he studied at Yale University, where he earned a Bachelor of Arts degree in 1909. He then worked for the American Trading Company. In 1911, he accompanied a zoological expedition of the Academy of Natural Sciences of Philadelphia to Ecuador. Upon his return, he became co-editor of the Travel Magazine. From 1915 to 1918 he was editor and from 1918 to 1937 managing editor of the magazine House & Garden. In 1920, he married Florence G. Edwards in New York City. A daughter resulted from this marriage. During the 1930s he was treasurer of the North American Rock Garden Society (NARGS) and in 1938, he founded the horticultural magazine Real Gardening. From 1943 to 1951 he was editor-in-chief of the magazine The Home Garden.

Lemmon travelled extensively throughout the United States and South America, where he studied the fauna and flora. He wrote over 300 articles for various magazines and several natural history books, including some for children. Initially, Lemmon's books dealt with domestic dogs, including his first work, Training the Dog, published in 1914, and The Puppy Book (1924) about puppies and About your Dog (1928). Lemmon was a member of the National Audubon Society, where he wrote several books for their Nature Program book series, the American Ornithologists' Union and the Yale Club of New York City.

Works 
 Training the Dog, McBride, Nast & Company, New York, 1914
 The Bamboo Trap, Doubdleday, Page & Company, 1923
 The Puppy Book, Doubleday, 1924
 with Richardson L. Wright: House & Garden′s Second Book of Gardens, Conde Nast, 1927
 About your Dog, Frederick A. Stokes Company, 1928
 Old Doc Lemmon, The Midland Company, 1930
 How to attract the birds: Planting, feeding, housing, American Garden Guild, 1947
 The Birds are yours, Macmillan, 1951 (illustrations by Don Richard Eckelberry)
 Our Amazing Birds: The little-known facts about their private lives,  American Garden Guild and Doubleday, 1952 (illustrations by Don Richard Eckelberry)
 The best loved Trees of America: Intimate Close-ups of their Year-round Traits, American Garden Guild and Doubleday, 1952
 National Audubon Society Nature Program: Favorite Wildflowers, Nelson Doubleday, 1954
 National Audubon Society Nature Program: Best Loved Song Birds, Nelson Doubleday, 1954
 National Audubon Society Nature Program: Flowering Trees and Shrubs, Nelson Doubleday, 1955
 National Audubon Society Nature Program: Seeds and Seed Pods, Nelson Doubleday, 1955
 National Audubon Society Nature Program: Dogs, Nelson Doubleday, 1955
 All about Birds, Random House, 1955
 National Audubon Society Nature Program: Burst of Spring, Nelson Doubleday, 1956
 National Audubon Society Nature Program: House Plants, Nelson Doubleday, 1956
 National Audubon Society Nature Program: Life on a Farm, Nelson Doubleday, 1956
 City Parks and Home Gardens, vol. 3 of the series The Community of Living Things (in collaboration with the National Audubon Society), Creative Educational Society, 1956
 All about Moths and Butterflies, Random House, 1956
 All about strange Beasts of the Present, Random House, 1957
 with Jean Zallinger: All about Monkeys, Random House, 1958
 with Charles L. Sherman: Flowers of the World in Full Color, Hannover House, 1958 (2nd edit. as Flowers of the World, 1964)
 National Audubon Society Nature Program: Favorite Song Birds, Nelson Doubleday, 1959
 Junior Science Book of Trees, Garrand Press, 1960 
 National Audubon Society Nature Program: Wildflowers of the Mountains, Nelson Doubleday, 1960
 Wildflowers of North America in Full Color, Hannover House, 1961
 Junior Science Book of Big Cats, Garrand Press, 1962 
 National Audubon Society Nature Program: Wild flowers of the meadows, Nelson Doubleday, 1967 (posthumous)

References 
 Who’s Who in America. A Biographical Dictionary of Notable Living Men and Women. Marquis Who’s Who, vol. 32, 1962–1963, p 1834
 Robert Lemmon, Naturalist, Dead; Author of Many Books Was Editor on Home Garden. The New York Times, 5 March 1964, p 30
 Virginia Tuttle Clayton: The Once & Future Gardener: Garden Writing from the Golden Age of Magazines: 1900–1940, David R. Godine, 2008, ISBN  (Short biographical entry on p 234)

1885 births
1964 deaths
Yale University alumni
American non-fiction writers
American nature writers
American male non-fiction writers
American naturalists
Dwight-Englewood School alumni
20th-century naturalists